King's Disease III is the sixteenth studio album by American rapper Nas. It was released on November 11, 2022 through Mass Appeal Records. The album is the third entry in Nas' King's Disease series of albums, and acts as a sequel to his 2020 album King's Disease and his 2021 album King's Disease II. The album, as with the previous two albums in the series, was executive produced by Nas and American record producer Hit-Boy. The album received widespread acclaim from critics.

Background
On December 24, 2021, Nas surprise-released his fourteenth album Magic. On the song "Ugly", Nas confirmed the third installment of the King's Disease series was in the works with the lyrics "KD3 on the way, this just to feed the buzz." On the same day, following the release of the album, American record producer Hit-Boy announced via Twitter that he and Nas had begun working on a third King's Disease album.

On October 18, 2022, Nas announced the album, along with its release date, with a promotional poster via his social media platforms.

Critical reception

King's Disease III was met with widespread acclaim. At Metacritic, which assigns a normalized rating out of 100 to reviews from professional publications, the album has received an average score of 88 based on ten reviews, indicating universal acclaim.

Reviewing the album for NME, Niall Smith claimed that, "With King’s Disease III, the New York rapper has put the seal on a strong album trilogy that proves that, three decades in, he's still a force to be reckoned with."

Chart performance
King's Disease III debuted at number 10 on the US Billboard 200 with 29,000 album-equivalent units, making it Nas's 16th top-10 album on the chart (a record he shares with American rapper JAY-Z). On November 18, 2022, King's Disease III debuted at number 48 on the UK Albums Chart and number 2 on the UK Hip Hop and R&B Albums Chart.

Track listing
All tracks produced by Hit-Boy, except where noted.

Sample credits
 "Legit" contains a sample of "A Heart Is a House for Love" written by Tristin Sigerson, Davitt Sigerson, and Bob Thiele, as performed by Billy Valentine and The Dells from The Five Heartbeats.
 "Ghetto Reporter" contains a sample of "Just Us" performed by Richard Pryor.
 "Thun" contains a sample of "The Bridge Is Over" written and performed by DJ Scott La Rock & KRS-One under the musical group Boogie Down Productions.
 "Hood2Hood" contains an interpolation of "Da Butt" written by Marcus Miller and performed by group E.U..
 "Get Light" contains an interpolation of "Party and Bullshit" written by Easy Mo Bee, as performed by The Notorious B.I.G.
 "Reminisce" contains a sample of "You Remind Me", written by Dave "Jam" Hall and Eric Milteer, as performed by Mary J. Blige.
 "I'm on Fire" contains elements from NBA Jam and Street Fighter II: The World Warrior.
 "Beef" contains a sample of "N.Y. State Of Mind", written by DJ Premier, as performed by Nas.
  "Til' My Last Breath" contains a sample of "Narco", written by Thom Jongkind, Idir Makhlaf and Timothy Jude Smith, as performed by Blasterjaxx and Timmy Trumpet.

Charts

References

2022 albums
Albums produced by Hit-Boy
Nas albums
Mass Appeal Records albums
Sequel albums